Regency at Monroe is a gated community and census-designated place (CDP) in Monroe Township, Middlesex County, New Jersey, United States. It is in the eastern part of the township, bordered by Mounts Mills Road to the north, Spotswood-Englishtown Road to the east, and Buckelew Avenue to the southwest.

It was first listed as a CDP in the 2020 census with a population of 2,036.

Demographics

2020 census

Note: the US Census treats Hispanic/Latino as an ethnic category. This table excludes Latinos from the racial categories and assigns them to a separate category. Hispanics/Latinos can be of any race.

References 

Census-designated places in Middlesex County, New Jersey
Census-designated places in New Jersey
Monroe Township, Middlesex County, New Jersey